Zinc finger protein 91 homolog (mouse), ciliary neurotrophic factor transcription unit, also known as ZFP91-CNTF, is a human gene.

The genes ZFP91 and CNTF are adjacent on chromosome 11. In addition to a monocistronic transcript from each locus, a co-transcribed transcript also exists. The co-transcribed mRNA encodes an isoform of ZFP91 but does not appear to encode a CNTF protein.

References

Further reading